List of official trees of the provinces of Thailand:

List

See also
Seals of the provinces of Thailand
List of trees of northern Thailand
List of U.S. state and territory trees

References

Bibliography
 ราชบัณฑิตยสถาน. พจนานุกรม ฉบับราชบัณฑิตยสถาน พ.ศ. ๒๕๕๔ เฉลิมพระเกียรติพระบาทสมเด็จพระเจ้าอยู่หัว เนื่องในโอกาสพระราชพิธีมหามงคลเฉลิมพระชนมพรรษา ๗ รอบ ๕ ธันวาคม ๒๕๕๔. กรุงเทพฯ : ราชบัณฑิตยสถาน, 2556. 
 ราชบัณฑิตยสถาน. หนังสืออนุกรมวิธานพืช อักษร ก. พิมพ์ครั้งที่ 2. กรุงเทพฯ : ราชบัณฑิตยสถาน, 2547. 
 ราชบัณฑิตยสถาน. หนังสืออนุกรมวิธานพืช อักษร ข. กรุงเทพฯ : ราชบัณฑิตยสถาน, 2547. 
 ราชันย์ ภู่มา และสมราน สุดดี, บรรณาธิการ. ชื่อพรรณไม้แห่งประเทศไทย เต็ม สมิตินันทน์ ฉบับแก้ไขเพิ่มเติม พ.ศ. 2557. กรุงเทพฯ : สำนักงานหอพรรณไม้ สำนักวิจัยการอนุรักษ์ป่าไม้และพันธุ์พืช กรมอุทยานแห่งชาติ สัตว์ป่า และพันธุ์พืช กระทรวงทรัพยากรธรรมชาติและสิ่งแวดล้อม, 2557. 
 ส่วนเพาะชำกล้าไม้. สำนักส่งเสริมการปลูกป่า. กรมป่าไม้. พันธุ์ไม้มงคลพระราชทาน. กรุงเทพฯ : มูลนิธิสถาบันราชพฤกษ์, 2540. 

Lists of trees
Provinces of Thailand
Lists of symbols